Almudena Fernández (born 1 January 1974) is a Spanish model.

Early life 
She was born in Benavente, in the province of Zamora.

Modeling 
Fernández has been the cover girl for fashion magazines such as Elle, Marie Claire, Vogue, Cosmopolitan, Madame Figaro, Shape, Biba, Joyce and Harper's Bazaar among others. She has been photographed by Michael Thompson, Ruben Afanador, Raphael Mazzucco, Walter Chin, David Bailey, Mark Baptist, Diego Uchitel, Norman Jean Roy for campaigns for Hermès, Givenchy, Cartier, Wolford, Revlon, Lacoste, Carolina Herrera, Lancel, Gianfranco Ferré, L'Oréal, Carrera y Carrera, Victoria's Secret, and Kookai. She also adorned the Hello!/Carrera y Carrera photo session with matador Eugenio de Mora, based upon the novel Blood and Sand by Vicente Blasco Ibáñez.

Cosmopolitan TV awarded Fernández as the best international model of 2007.

Acting career
Ever since Fernández arrived in New York, she has combined her work as a model with acting classes at the school The New Actors Workshop directed by George Morrison and the Academy Award winner Mike Nichols.

Fernández took acting classes at Cristina Rota's school of actors in Madrid which led her to star at Willie Nelson's "Maria" video clip aside Luke Wilson.

References

External links
 Almudena Fernández' profile in the FMD-database
 Askmen's Model of the Week

1977 births
Living people
People from the Province of Zamora
Spanish female models